Louisiana Slim is the second album by jazz organist Leon Spencer recorded for the Prestige label in 1971.

Reception

The Allmusic site awarded the album 4 stars stating "It is a pity that Spencer's career ultimately went nowhere, for he holds his own with his contemporaries throughout this recommended soul-jazz release".

Track listing
All compositions by Leon Spencer except as indicated.
 "Louisiana Slim" - 10:08  
 "Mercy Mercy Me (The Ecology)" (Marvin Gaye) - 4:06  
 "(They Long to Be) Close to You" (Burt Bacharach, Hal David) - 5:24  
 "Our Love Will Never Die" - 10:17  
 "The Trouble With Love" - 8:26

Personnel
Leon Spencer - organ
Virgil Jones - trumpet
Grover Washington, Jr. - tenor saxophone, flute
Melvin Sparks - guitar
Idris Muhammad - drums
Buddy Caldwell - congas

Production
 Bob Porter - producer
 Rudy Van Gelder - engineer

References

Leon Spencer albums
1971 albums
Prestige Records albums
Albums produced by Bob Porter (record producer)
Albums recorded at Van Gelder Studio